Hercules and Omphale is a circa 1602 painting by Peter Paul Rubens, now held in the Louvre Museum in Paris.

It measures 278 by 216 cm and shows Hercules and Omphale.

References

External links
 http://cartelfr.louvre.fr/cartelfr/visite?srv=car_not_frame&idNotice=5567

1603 paintings
Mythological paintings by Peter Paul Rubens
Paintings in the Louvre by Dutch, Flemish and German artists
Paintings depicting Heracles